Adolf Weich Malan (born 6 September 1961) is a former South African rugby union player. He played 159 matches for Northern Transvaal. His usual position was as lock, where he also played for the national team, the Springboks.

Playing career
Malan made his debut for South Africa on 26 August 1989 against a World XV team. The match was played at Newlands in Cape Town, and Malan started at lock, with the Springboks winning 20 to 19. He played in the subsequent test against the World XV, which was won 22 to 16 at Ellis Park.

Malan next played for the Springboks in 1992, when he earned five international caps for South Africa, the first of which was against the All Blacks at Ellis Park, which the Springboks lost 24 to 27, as well as the following test against Australia. He then played in two tests against France in France, winning one and losing one. Malan's last test was on 14 November 1992 against England. Malan was known as a strong ball winner in the line–out.

Test history

Accolades 
In 2000 he was inducted into the University of Pretoria Hall of fame.

Trivia
Malan and his lock partner against the World XV, Niel Hugo had the honour of being the tallest Springbok players at 2.04m. In 2008 Andries Bekker became the tallest Springbok, at 2.08m.

See also
List of South Africa national rugby union players – Springbok no. 556

References

External links 
Adolf Malan on genslin.us

1961 births
Living people
South African rugby union players
South Africa international rugby union players
Rugby union locks
University of Pretoria alumni
Rugby union players from Germiston
Blue Bulls players